Norman Brookes defeated Arthur Gore 6–4, 6–2, 6–2 in the All-Comers final to win the gentlemen's singles tennis title at the 1907 Wimbledon Championships. The reigning champion Laurence Doherty did not defend his title. Brookes was the first overseas winner of the men's singles title. Four of the most promising international tennis players were concentrated in section 5 of the draw.

Draw

All comers' finals

Top half

Section 1

Section 2

Section 3

Section 4

Bottom half

Section 5

Section 6

Section 7

Section 8

References

External links

Men's Singles
Wimbledon Championship by year – Men's singles